Jeff Chan or Jeffrey Chan may refer to:

Jeff Chan (basketball) (born 1983), Filipino basketball player
Jeff Chan (saxophonist) (born 1970), American saxophonist
Jeff Chan (film director), American film director
Jeffery Paul Chan (1942–2022), American author and scholar

See also 

 Jeff Chang (disambiguation)